Wappocomo may refer to:
Wappocomo — also spelled Wapocoma, Wapocomo, and Wappatomaka — a Native American term for the South Branch Potomac River, West Virginia, USA
Wappocomo, West Virginia, an unincorporated community in Hampshire County, West Virginia
Wappocomo (Romney, West Virginia), a 1774 plantation north of Romney, Hampshire County, West Virginia

See also
Potomac (disambiguation)